Lieutenant general Edward Allen Partain (23 June 1929 – 24 March 1996) was a United States Army officer who served in the Korean War and the Vietnam War.

Military career
He graduated from the United States Military Academy (West Point) in 1951.

In 1964 he assisted Colonel Clyde Russell in establishing Military Assistance Command, Vietnam – Studies and Observations Group.

In June 1967 he served as commander of the 2nd Battalion, 503rd Infantry Regiment, part of the 173rd Airborne Brigade during the Vietnam War and participated in the Battle of the Slopes.

He served as commanding general of the 1st Infantry Division from July 1980 to December 1982.

He served as commanding general, Fifth United States Army from January 1983 until his retirement from the Army in January 1985.

References

United States Army generals
1929 births
1996 deaths
United States Army personnel of the Korean War
United States Army personnel of the Vietnam War
United States Military Academy alumni